The World Wildlife Fund (WWF) identifies terrestrial, marine, freshwater, and ecoregions:
Global 200
List of terrestrial ecoregions (WWF) 867 terrestrial ecoregions.
List of marine ecoregions (WWF), 232 marine ecoregions of the coastal and continental shelf areas.
List of freshwater ecoregions (WWF), 426 freshwater ecoregions.